is a Japanese actress and gravure idol signed under Box Corporation. She is best known for her role Saki Royama/Go-on Yellow in Super Sentai series  Engine Sentai Go-Onger.

History
She debuted in 2008 in the TV Asahi's tokusatsu series Engine Sentai Go-onger as Saki Rōyama/Go-on Yellow.
 
She is ranked 249th out of 422001 people according to Oricon Style's page.

She was selected to be the support manager for the 87th All Japan High School Soccer Tournament. Previous managers were idols like Maki Horikita, Yui Aragaki, and Kie Kitano.

Filmography

Film

TV Drama

CD
G3 Princess Rap: Pretty Love Limited (G3プリンセス ラップ～PRETTY LOVE♡Limited～)
G3 Princess CD Box Limited Release

Live Matches 

87th All Japan High School Soccer Tournament Support Manager

CM
Kowa [Puchiuna Kowa] Summer CM
Kowa [Goruken Kowa] CM
Japan Kentucky Fried Chicken [Your Support,Pizza Hut's Pizza Fight!] CM
Kowa [Puchiuna ALPHA] CM
Shunkado [Unagipai50] CM

DVD
 Rina Aizawa: Smile (Released July 21, 2008 Toei)
 Rina Aizawa: Holiday (Released September 25, 2009 Wani)
 RINA'S WONDERLAND 19Graffiti (Released July 23, 2010 Takeshobo)
 LINA Jump (Released June 23, 2010 Liverpool)

Photobook
Engine Sentai Go-Onger Photobook Mahha Zenkai! <炎神戦隊ゴーオンジャー写真集 マッハ全開！>(Released August 2008 Ichijinsha)
G3 Princess Picture Book <G3プリンセスビジュアルBOOK> (Released October 2008 Gakken)
Engine Sentai Go-Onger Character Book Let's Go On!!!! <炎神戦隊ゴーオンジャーキャラクターブック Let's GO ON!!!!> (Released February 2009 Tokyo News Service)
『Rina』 First Official Photobook <逢沢りな写真集『Rina』> (Released July 28, 2009 Wani)
「Welina ‐a girl's memory in her teens‐」 Second Official Photobook <逢沢りな写真集/「Welina ‐a girl's memory in her teens‐」> (Released April 21, 2011 Shueisha)

Calendar
 Rina Aizawa Try-X 2009 Calendar (Released September 27, 2008)
 Rina Aizawa Try-X 2010 Calendar (Released October 10, 2009)
 Rina Aizawa Try-X 2011 Calendar (Released October 2, 2010)

References

External links
 
 

1991 births
Living people
21st-century Japanese actresses
Japanese gravure models
Japanese female models